"You've Got to Talk to Me" is a song written by Jamie O'Hara, and recorded by American country music singer Lee Ann Womack.  It was released in November 1997 as the third and last single from her self-titled debut album.

The song spent twenty-two weeks on the Hot Country Songs charts, peaking at number 2 in early 1998. It also peaked at number 2 on the Canadian country singles charts published by RPM.

Chart performance

Year-end charts

References

1997 singles
Lee Ann Womack songs
Songs written by Jamie O'Hara (singer)
Decca Records singles
Song recordings produced by Mark Wright (record producer)